Polina Alekseyevna Leykina (born 20 September 1994) is a Russian professional tennis player.

She has career-high WTA rankings of 184 in singles, achieved on 1 August 2016, and 230 in doubles, set on 28 December 2015. Leykina has won nine singles titles and 15 doubles titles on the ITF Women's Circuit.

She made her WTA Tour main-draw debut at the 2016 Grand Prix SAR La Princesse Lalla Meryem, in the doubles event partnering Yulia Putintseva.

ITF finals

Singles: 17 (11 titles, 6 runner–ups)

Doubles: 29 (17 titles, 12 runner-ups)

Notes

External links
 
 

1994 births
Living people
Russian female tennis players
Tennis players from Moscow
20th-century Russian women
21st-century Russian women